Douglas Alan Mathis (born June 7, 1983) is a former professional baseball pitcher and current pitching coach with the Los Angeles Dodgers for their AAA affiliate in  Oklahoma City. He played in Major League Baseball, the KBO League, Nippon Professional Baseball (NPB), and the Chinese Professional Baseball League (CPBL). Previously he was a coach in the Seattle Mariners, Toronto Blue Jays and Texas Rangers organizations.

Amateur career
Mathis attended Show Low High School in Show Low, Arizona. He was drafted by the Los Angeles Dodgers after his senior year. He did not sign with the Dodgers, but instead attended Central Arizona College in Coolidge, Arizona. After his first year at Central Arizona, Mathis was drafted in the 31st round by the Seattle Mariners. He declined once again and decided to attend the University of Missouri to play college baseball for the Missouri Tigers. After one year, he was drafted by the Rangers and signed a minor league contract.

Playing career

Texas Rangers
In 2006, Mathis played for the Advanced A Bakersfield Blaze and was California League Pitcher of the Week twice. In 2007, he was Texas League Pitcher of the Week twice and was a mid-season all-star for the AA Frisco RoughRiders. Mathis began the 2008 season with the AAA Oklahoma City RedHawks and was called to the majors in May. Mathis made his major league debut with the Rangers on May 12, when he entered the game against the Seattle Mariners in the 10th inning and was the winning pitcher in the Rangers' 13–12 victory.  During the early part of the 2010 season, Mathis was sent down to the minor leagues, where he continued to struggle getting batters out.

Cleveland Indians/San Francisco Giants/Oakland Athletics
On January 5, 2011, he signed a minor league contract with the Cleveland Indians. He was later released by Cleveland and signed a minor league contract with the San Francisco Giants before being released by them. Mathis then signed a minor league contract with the Oakland Athletics on June 18.

Samsung Lions
On July 16, 2011, Mathis joined the Samsung Lions in the Korea Baseball Organization. He went 5–2 with a 2.52 earned run average during the 2011 regular season.

Boston Red Sox
Mathis signed a minor league contract with the Boston Red Sox on December 11, 2011.

On July 25, 2012, the Boston Red Sox released Mathis.

Chiba Lotte Marines
Mathis signed with the Chiba Lotte Marines in Japan on July 27, 2012.

Texas Rangers
Mathis signed a minor league contract with the Texas Rangers on December 13, 2013. He was later released on April 11.

Tampa Bay Rays
On April 16, 2014, Mathis signed a minor league contract with the Tampa Bay Rays.

Uni-President 7-Eleven Lions
On May 7, 2015, Mathis signed with the Uni-President 7-Eleven Lions  of the Chinese Professional Baseball League.

Coaching career
Mathis was the pitching coach of the Clinton LumberKings in the Seattle Mariners organization in 2017 and 2018. Mathis moved to the Toronto Blue Jays organization in 2019, as the pitching coach of the Buffalo Bisons.

Mathis was named the bullpen coach of the Texas Rangers on January 2, 2020. Mathis was named a Rangers co-pitching coach, along with Brendan Sagara, following the 2019 season. The Rangers dismissed Mathis and Sagara after the 2022 season.

References

External links

 Career statistics and player information from Korea Baseball Organization

1983 births
Living people
American expatriate baseball players in Japan
American expatriate baseball players in South Korea
American expatriate baseball players in Taiwan
Baseball coaches from Arizona
Baseball players from Phoenix, Arizona
Major League Baseball bullpen coaches
Major League Baseball pitchers
Major League Baseball pitching coaches
KBO League pitchers
Nippon Professional Baseball pitchers
Texas Rangers players
Samsung Lions players
Chiba Lotte Marines players
Uni-President 7-Eleven Lions players
Texas Rangers coaches
Central Arizona Vaqueros baseball players
Spokane Indians players
Frisco RoughRiders players
Bakersfield Blaze players
Oklahoma RedHawks players
Arizona League Rangers players
Oklahoma City RedHawks players
Fresno Grizzlies players
Sacramento River Cats players
Pawtucket Red Sox players
Indianapolis Indians players
New Orleans Zephyrs players
Round Rock Express players
Durham Bulls players
Toros del Este players
American expatriate baseball players in the Dominican Republic
Tigres de Aragua players
American expatriate baseball players in Venezuela
Minor league baseball coaches
Missouri Tigers baseball players
Duluth Huskies players